Florian Esdorf (born 21 February 1995) is a German footballer who plays as a defender for F.C. Hansa Rostock II.

Career
Born in Rostock, Esdorf started his senior career at Hansa Rostock. He joined FC Schönberg on a half-season loan in August 2016, before the loan was extended until the end of the season. In the summer of 2017, Esdorf joined Regionalliga Nordost side Wacker Nordhausen. After 70 league appearances with Wacker Nordhausen, he returned to Hansa Rostock in 2020, joining Hansa Rostock II.

References

External links
 

1995 births
Living people
Sportspeople from Rostock
German footballers
Association football defenders
FC Hansa Rostock players
FSV Wacker 90 Nordhausen players
Regionalliga players
3. Liga players
Footballers from Mecklenburg-Western Pomerania